Mamute Mbonga (born 24 April 1964) is a Congolese judoka. He competed in the men's half-heavyweight event at the 1992 Summer Olympics.

References

External links
 

1964 births
Living people
Democratic Republic of the Congo male judoka
Olympic judoka of the Democratic Republic of the Congo
Judoka at the 1992 Summer Olympics
Place of birth missing (living people)
21st-century Democratic Republic of the Congo people